Sid Raymond (born Raymond Silverstein, January 21, 1909 – December 1, 2006) was an American comedian and character actor.

Early years 
Born Raymond Silverstein in Manhattan, Raymond dropped out of New York University and became the recreation director at a resort in the Catskills.

Career 
Raymond traveled for the radio program Major Bowes Amateur Hour, seeking talented people across the United States. He also entertained military troops during World War II and, in 1950, portrayed Finnegan in the Duffy's Tavern radio show.

He appeared in many films and commercials, and was active nearly until his death. He is probably best remembered as being the voice for Baby Huey. In addition, Raymond did the voice for Katnip the cat of Herman and Katnip fame (Katnip also appeared in several Buzzy the Crow cartoons). He was also one of several actors (notably Dayton Allen) who voiced magpies Heckle and Jeckle. On radio, Raymond was "Finnegan" on Duffy's Tavern during its final seasons. He returned to play the character of Baby Huey in The Baby Huey Show in the 1990s, though he was replaced by Joe Alaskey in the show's second season.

On Broadway, Raymond portrayed Candy Butcher in Something About a Soldier (1962) and Mr. Diamond in Golden Rainbow (1968).

The short documentary Sid at 90 was about Raymond.

Personal life and death 
Raymond was married to the former Dorothy Naftel for 69 years. He died in Aventura, Florida, aged 97, where he lived with his wife, from complications of a stroke the week before.

Filmography

References

External links 

1909 births
2006 deaths
20th-century American male actors
American male voice actors
American male radio actors
American male comedians
Male actors from New York City
People from Aventura, Florida
Paramount Pictures contract players
Famous Studios people